The 2006 NCAA Division I men's lacrosse tournament was the 36th annual Division I NCAA Men's Lacrosse Championship tournament. Sixteen NCAA Division I college men's lacrosse teams met after having played their way through a regular season, and for some, a conference tournament.

The semifinals (Final Four) and the championship game were played at Lincoln Financial Field in Philadelphia, Pennsylvania in front of 47,062 fans. The Virginia Cavaliers won the national title with a 15–7 win over Massachusetts. The Cavaliers, led by Matt Ward and Ben Rubeor, completed a perfect 17–0 record in winning their fourth NCAA championship and sixth national lacrosse title overall. The Minutemen became the second unseeded team to make the NCAA final (Towson also accomplished this in 1991).

Tournament results 

 * = Overtime

References

External links
http://www.ncaasports.com/lacrosse/mens/history/2006
http://www.laxpower.com/

NCAA Division I Men's Lacrosse Championship
NCAA Division I Men's Lacrosse Championship
NCAA Division I Men's Lacrosse Championship
NCAA Division I Men's Lacrosse Championship